Civil law may refer to:
 Civil law (common law), the part of law that concerns private citizens and legal persons
 Civil law (legal system), or continental law, a legal system originating in continental Europe and based on Roman law
 Private law, the branch of law in a civil law legal system that concerns relations among private individuals
 Municipal law, the domestic law of a state, as opposed to international law

See also 
 Civil code
 Civil (disambiguation)
 Ius civile, Latin for "civil law"
 Common law (disambiguation)
 Criminal law